Yuba County Library is a library service for 70,000 people of Yuba County, California.

History
The library currently has one branch in Marysville.

References

External links
Yuba County Library official website

Education in Yuba County, California
Yuba
Buildings and structures in Yuba County, California